Veitchia metiti is a species of flowering plant in the family Arecaceae. It is found only in Vanuatu, where it is native to the islands of Vanua Lava and Ureparapara.

References

metiti
Trees of Vanuatu
Conservation dependent plants
Endemic flora of Vanuatu
Taxa named by Odoardo Beccari
Taxonomy articles created by Polbot